Proofing may refer to:

 Proofing (armour), the testing of armour for its defensive ability
 Proofing (baking technique), a rest period during the fermentation of bread dough
 Proofing (prepress), a concept in print production
 Proof testing, a form of stress test to demonstrate the fitness of a load-bearing structure

See also

 Proof (disambiguation)
 Bulletproofing, provision for resisting fired bullets
 Fireproofing, provision for resisting fire
 Waterproofing, provision for resisting water